The 1st Ibsley Formula 2 Race was a non-championship Formula Two motor race held at Ibsley Circuit, Ibsley, Dorset on 19 April 1952. The race was won by Mike Hawthorn in a Cooper T20-Bristol. George Abecassis was second and set fastest lap in an HWM-Alta and Bill Dobson in a Ferrari 125 was third.

Results

References

Ibsley
Ibsley
Ibsley